The Golden Knight (Chinese: 金衣大俠) is a 1970 Hong Kong martial arts film directed by Yueh Feng and starring Lily Ho Li Li.

Plot

After her father's murder at the hands of the Golden Knight organization, swords-women Yu Fei-hsia (Lily Ho Li Li) is accused of killing clan member in vengeance. To prove her innocents Yu Fei-hsia attempts to track down the real killer.

Cast
 as Yu Fei-hsia, main protagonist and swords-women
Yuen Kao as Liu Yi-nan, a sympathetic Golden Knight member
Pei-Pei Shu as Ai Ching

References

External links
 
 

Shaw Brothers Studio films
Wuxia films
Hong Kong martial arts films
Films directed by Yueh Feng
1970s Hong Kong films